A paper organization is any group which exists more in theory than reality.  The term "paper organization" is used in two different contexts, that of the military and that of the labor movement.

Military
For the military, a unit which is not combat-ready due to a planned or unplanned lack of personnel or basic equipment, but which remains in existence on the books, is called a "paper organization." Such a rating of an organization is a regular part of the planning process and the term is not pejorative.

Political
In the trade union and radical political movements, a "paper organization" is a group ostensibly in existence for a specific purpose, but which remains a phantom. For example, a single individual might claim to represent a non-existing local unit of a national organization in attempt to gain admission as a delegate and thus help "pack" a national convention in favor of a particular faction. Such a phantom unit would be called a "paper organization." Alternatively, the term can be used with regards to a single-interest group with an impressive name but no greater existence than a letterhead and a mailing address, and no concrete existence in fact. Some so-called Communist front groups were an example of this latter form of "paper organization."

See also 
Astroturfing
Shell (corporation)
Front organization

Trade unions
Military operations
Types of organization